Übergroß coalition (German: Übergroße Koalition) aka "oversized/extralarge coalition", über meaning above and groß meaning large, is a term used in German politics to designate a coalition that includes more parties than mathematically necessary for a majority in a legislative body.

Background 
Übergroß coalition is not (necessarily) related to the Große Koalition which is used to refer to a coalition consisting of the two major parties, CDU/CSU and SPD. These kind of coalitions are most likely to be formed during times of crisis, so that they are not bound by party politics, but also when simple government majorities are not sufficient and larger majorities are needed (for example, for constitutional amendments) or in the case of relatively undisciplined parliamentary groups, where too narrow a majority carries a strong risk of failure.

Übergroß coalitions were quite common during the early days of the Federal Republic. At federal level, these kind of coalitions have been formed only twice: in 1953, when CDU/CSU came just one seat short of majority and could have formed a government by including just one party, but still formed a four-party government with FDP, DP and GB/BHE; and also in 1957, when CDU/CSU won a comfortable 21-seat majority, but still chose to include DP.

The coalitions were still formed for a bit longer time in the Landtags. The last such coalition was formed in Hamburg following 1970 elections, when SPD alone held a comfortable 10-seat majority, but still chose to form a coalition with FPD, which lasted until 1974.

Since the reunification, parties usually tend to form coalitions with ideologically closer parties (CDU/CSU and FDP; and SPD and Greens), or form a grand coalition or a coalition of three or more parties when necessary to avoid going into coalition with more extreme parties such as AfD. Otherwise, the parties are generally reluctant to join coalitions where they are not needed towards a majority.

Currently, an übergroß coalition exists in the Landtag of Saxony-Anhalt. Following the 2021 state elections, a Grand coalition (CDU and SPD) alone held a one-seat majority, but Minister-President Reiner Haseloff (CDU)  chose to also include FDP and thus formed a "Germany coalition". He did it due to the Saxony-Anhalt state branch being somewhat undisciplined, with speculations of some right-wing dissent. At the Minister-President election, Haseloff unexpectedly failed to get elected on the first ballot, coming just one seat short of the majority, but was successfully elected on the second ballot.

References

Coalition governments
Coalition governments of Germany